Khatibi (also Romanized as Khaţībī; also known as Ḩoseynābād and Khitābi) is a village in Afin Rural District, Zohan District, Zirkuh County, South Khorasan Province, Iran. At the 2006 census, its population was 94, in 25 families.

References 

Populated places in Zirkuh County